"Diamond Girl" is a song by American soft rock duo Seals and Crofts, released as a single in 1973. It is the title track of their fifth studio album, Diamond Girl. Like their previous top 10 hit "Summer Breeze", "Diamond Girl" also reached No. 6 on the Billboard Hot 100, and No. 4 on the Adult Contemporary chart.

Chart performance

Weekly charts

Year-end charts

References

1973 songs
1973 singles
Seals and Crofts songs
Songs written by James Seals
Warner Records singles